Nam Cheong (Chinese: 南昌) is both the Cantonese name for Nanchang and the name of a street in Sham Shui Po, Hong Kong. 

In the latter context, several features have been named after Nam Cheong Street: 

 Nam Cheong Estate
 Nam Cheong Park
 Nam Cheong station

See also
Nanchang (disambiguation)